Albania competed at the 2018 Winter Olympics in Pyeongchang, South Korea, from 9 to 25 February 2018. In 2017 the Albanian National Olympic Committee was hoping to qualify at least three athletes, which would have marked the largest team the country sent to the Winter Olympics.

Competitors
The following is the list of number of competitors participating in the delegation per sport.

Alpine skiing 

Albania qualified two alpine skiers, one male and one female.

See also
Albania at the 2018 Summer Youth Olympics

References

Nations at the 2018 Winter Olympics
2018
2018 in Albanian sport